Louise Wallace may refer to:

 Louise Wallace (born 1959), New Zealand television presenter, actress, and director.
 Louise Wallace (writer) (born 1983), New Zealand poet